South Side Park is an urban park in Pittsburgh.  It is situated in a ravine that divides the South Side Slopes neighborhood, and extends to the location of the former Oliver Ormsby estate in Mount Oliver, Pennsylvania, Ormsby Manor.

History
The park occupies land formerly used by the St. Clair Incline, and the former site of a Sankey brick works.

Plant Species 
Invasive Species: 1. Vitis  2. Reynoutria japonica (syn. Fallopia japonica)  3. Alliaria petiolata 4. Lonicera japonica 5. Menispermum canadense  6. Catalpa speciosa 7. Cirsium arvense  8. Celastrus orbiculatus

External links
 Pittsburgh Dept. of Parks & Recreation website
 South Side Chamber of Commerce 

Parks in Pittsburgh